Birim North District is one of the thirty-three districts in Eastern Region, Ghana. Originally created as an ordinary district assembly in 1988, which was created from the former Birim District Council, until the southern part of the district was split off to create Akyemansa District on 29 February 2008; thus the remaining part has been retained as Birim North District. The district assembly is located in the southwest part of Eastern Region and has New Abirem as its capital town.

Geography
The Birim River flows through the Birim North District, an important source of diamonds.

List of settlements

External links
 
 Biram North District Official Website

References

Districts of the Eastern Region (Ghana)